Epaderm is brand of emollient made by Mölnlycke Health Care, which is used for the treatment of dry skin, including conditions such as eczema.

Epaderm contains two active ingredients, emulsifying wax and yellow soft paraffin. It also contains liquid paraffin. The formulation contains no fragrances, colourings or additives, and the emulsifying wax does not contain sodium lauryl sulphate, according to the manufacturer. Epaderm provides a film barrier which aids moisture retention within the skin. It is very versatile and can be used on the skin as an emollient, as a bath additive or as a skin cleanser when washing or showering. It therefore offers the three stages of atopic eczema treatment, as suggested for complete emollient therapy.

Epaderm was originally developed by doctors at the Royal Victoria Infirmary in Newcastle upon Tyne for eczema suffering babies.

Emollients and protectives